The 1999–2000 Divizia B was the 60th season of the second tier of the Romanian football league system.

The format has been maintained to two series, each of them having 18 teams. At the end of the season, the winners of the series promoted to Divizia A and the last four places from both series relegated to Divizia C.

Team changes

To Divizia B
Promoted from Divizia C
 Diplomatic Focșani
 Callatis Mangalia
 Electro-Bere Craiova
 UM Timișoara
 Juventus București
 Flacăra Râmnicu Vâlcea

Relegated from Divizia A
 Foresta Suceava
 Universitatea Cluj
 Olimpia Satu Mare

From Divizia B
Relegated to Divizia C
 Rulmentul Alexandria
 Vega Deva
 Nitramonia Făgăraș
 Baia Mare
 Dacia Unirea Brăila
 Unirea Dej

Promoted to Divizia A
 Brașov
 Extensiv Craiova
 Rocar București

League tables

Seria I

Seria II

Top scorers 
26 goals
  Mihai Baicu (Foresta Suceava)

14 goals
  Nicolae Dică (Dacia Pitești)

12 goals

  Laurențiu Diniță (Sportul Studențesc)
  Marius Păcurar (Foresta Suceava)
  Adrian Dulcea (Olimpia Satu Mare)
  Horațiu Cioloboc (ASA Târgu Mureș)

9 goals

  Ionuț Badea (Dacia Pitești)
  Gigi Gorga (Metrom Brașov)
  Claudiu Boaru (Gaz Metan Mediaș)
  Tihamer Török (Precizia Săcele)

8 goals

  Sorin Bucuroaia (ARO Câmpulung)
  Sorin Oncică (Tractorul Brașov)

See also 
1999–2000 Divizia A
1999–2000 Divizia D

References 

Liga II seasons
Rom
2